Şehrazat Kemali Söylemezoğlu (born 3 September 1952), known by her stage name Şehrazat or Şehro, is a Turkish celebutante, television personality, businesswoman, philanthropist, composer, songwriter, record producer, occasional jazz, and pop music singer.

Life and career

Early life and family
Her father S. Siham Kemali Söylemezoğlu (d. 13 April 1981; Vienna) was a notable businessman and was considered to be the first mining magnate of Turkey. Her grandfather is Süleyman Şefik Pasha, the son of the Beylerbey of Rumelia Ali Kemali Pasha who is the only brother of Edhem Pertev Pasha and one of the former governors of Konya. Her mother Sevinç Tevs was the sister of artist Sevim Tevs and the daughter of the Turkish ambassador to the Republic of Albania. She was the first internationally known jazz singer of Turkey and described by the authorities as having one of the most wondrous voices of the 20th century. She was regarded as a diva since she surpassed Sarah Vaughan and won the 1948 Miami Jazz Festival, with the song "For You" that was composed by their family friend Arif Mardin, the 12-time Grammy Award winning Turkish-American music producer. She graduated from the International School of Choueifat, in Beirut, Lebanon in 1970. It was her parents' wish that she attend it for the sake of a better education. Prior to this, she spent the vast majority of her childhood in Turkey. Şehrazat is exceedingly fluent in Turkish, Arabic, French, and English.

As an only child from an affluent family, Şehrazat has received a large amount of mass media's attention due to her wealth and lifestyle. However, she has a half-brother Süleyman Şefik Söylemezoğlu named after their paternal grandfather, who is the son of Aynur Bıyıktay-Söylemezoğlu (the daughter of Ömer Halis Bıyıktay and the niece of Kâzım Karabekir, from her mother's side). Şehrazat's maternal great-grandfather is the most widely recognized composer of Turkish Classical Music, Hammamizade İsmail Dede Efendi. Having been married to the daughter of diplomat and author Galip Kemali Söylemezoğlu, the great uncle of Şehrazat, Hüsrev Gerede is her uncle by marriage. In addition to this, among her uncles are Cevdet Çağla, a famous composer of Turkish music and Prof. Dr. Hamit Kemali Söylemezoğlu, the architect of Anıtkabir and Taşkışla. Besides, journalist Mithat Perin (preceptor of Abdi İpekçi), diplomat Özer F. Tevs, politician Selim Sarper, and diplomat Yüksel Söylemez are also her close relatives. Some of the grandsons and granddaughters of His Imperial Majesty Mehmet V Reshad, the Emperor of the Ottomans and the Caliph of the Faithful such as HH Prince Cengiz Osmanoğlu, HH Prince Ömer Fevzi Osmanoğlu, HH Mihrimah Sultana are Şehrazat's cousins. Thus, Şehrazat's aunt Perizat Söylemezoğlu-Perin, formerly HH Princess Perizat Söylemezoğlu-Osmanoğlu, was the spouse of HH Prince Mehmet Nazım Osmanoğlu—the eldest son of HIH Prince Mehmed Ziyaeddin Efendi—and is the mother of HH Prince Cengiz Osmanoğlu. Another aunt of Şehrazat is Belkız Rufa Kemali Söylemezoğlu, the socialite. Moreover, Şehrazat's nephew is the former goalkeeper of Galatasaray football club Turgay Şeren and her niece is Hülya Koçyiğit who is a Turkish actress and is considered to be one of Turkish cinema's most famous female leads. Almost everybody in her family has graduated from Galatasaray High School, the most influential school in Turkey.

Music career
The owner of thousands of Turkish hit works, Şehrazat's first hit song is "Yaz Yaz Yaz" that was sung by Turkish superstar Ajda Pekkan. This song was a reform in Turkish pop music. More recently, Bengü's "Kocaman Öpüyorum" and "Sırada Sen Varsın" are also hits written by Şehrazat. Demet Sağıroğlu's debut "Kınalı Bebek" in 1994, was another very popular song by Şehrazat. Additionally, even though she has a very rare and wondrous voice like her mother does, she is commonly known for her music productions and compositions rather than active performances. Hence, in the late 1970s and the early 1980s, she was known for singing arrangements, most notably, "Aşk Bir Kumarsa" (ABBA's "The Winner Takes It All" cover), "İki Gölge" (Sandy Posey's "All Hung up in Your Green Eyes" cover), "İmkânsız Aşk" (Dusty Springfield's "I Close My Eyes and Count to Ten" cover), and Kelebek (Engelbert Humperdinck's "Free as the Wind (Theme from Papillon)" cover). During the period 1975–87, due to her polyglotism and eclectic, wide-ranging repertoire of contemporary and narrative songs in English, Şehrazat, as a soloist, managed to perform periodically in Playboy and Gala, which were VIP locations featuring Turkey's leading performance artists. With a wealth of great songs and stage presence, her intense show was really appreciated by the audience and the media, however, she decided to quit performing but to keep on songwriting. Her voice is likely to be classified as contralto with a strong lower register since she possesses a significant vocal agility and endurance. That is why Şehrazat is able to sing the high soprano notes and the low baritone notes as well.

Şehrazat was also the producer of superstar Ajda Pekkan, Sibel Tüzün, the former Eurovision Song Contest participant, Yıldız Kaplan, Reyhan Karaca, Zeliha Sunal, and Band AF. Sezen Aksu, another Turkish pop music singer, songwriter and producer who sold over 40 million albums worldwide, is the closest colleague of Şehrazat.

On 2 February 1985, Şehrazat as a special guest star performed in the music feast of a monthly TV-show "Do-Re-Mi", called "Jazz and Dance Night", with the song "Break Me". At the night, there was also a Coşkun Demir-Şehrazat duet "Baby Come to Me". She concurrently appeared in Cem Özer's Star TV show "Laf Lafı Açıyor" on 19 June 1992 and on 3 May 1996 when the show transferred to Kanal D.

30th anniversary tribute
On 24 January 2004, Şehrazat celebrated her 30-year anniversary as a lyricist and composer, which took place in the form of a huge concert named "Şehrazat Şarkıları" and given in Istanbul at the Levent İş Sanat Cultural Center in association with Türkiye İş Bankası. She sang some of her greatest hits and had guests such as Sezen Aksu, Nilüfer, Ajda Pekkan, Aşkın Nur Yengi, Emel Müftüoğlu, and Muazzez Abacı join her on stage. At the instance of Şehrazat, all proceeds from this concert as well as profits from the sales of each ticket sold for the event was donated to the TSK Elele Foundation of the General Staff of the Republic of Turkey. Apart from this, "Şehrazat Şarkıları" was also aired by the ATV Television Network in 2005.

Discography

Extended Play: 1968
İki Gölge (A-side)
Dün Gece (B-side)

Arrangements: 1969
Beni Unutma
İmkânsız Aşk

45 rpm records: 1970s
Kelebek (2:58)
Dili Dost, Kalbi Düşman (1974)
Söz Sevgilim, Söz (04:06; A 1974 45rpm in collaboration with Cömert Baykent)
Kolkola (Dalida cover; Turkish lyrics by Ümit Yaşar Oğuzcan)
Ne Kapımı Çalan Var
Nerede olsan

Maxi single: 1980
Sevemedim Karagözlüm (considered the first maxi-single (MCD) of Turkey)

Extended Play: 1980
Sevemedim Karagözlüm (A-side 4:49)
Hürüm Artık (A-side 3:52)
Bahşiş (B-side 3:26)
Seni Sevmişim (B-side 3:22)

Long Play: 1981
Sevdim Genç Bir Adamı
Kendim Ettim, Kendim Buldum (Eyvah)
Yanında
Aşk Bir Kumarsa
Kulakların Çınlasın
Lay la, Lay la (Yaşamaya Bak Sen)

Compilation album: 2002
Bak Bir Varmış Bir Yokmuş: 60'lı ve 70'li Yılların Orijinal Kayıtları

Compilation album: 2007
Our Golden Songs

Compilation album: 2008
Çınar Vol. I (In loving memory of Aysel Gürel, the late lyricist)
"Rüşvet" (writer(s), Aysel Gürel, Şehrazat, Volga Tamöz)

Songwriting credits

Awards
Runner-up in Hey Magazine's List of Bests and Most Promising Female Singers in 1970 (969 votes)
Yekta Okur Honorary Award of the 4th Kral TV Video and Music Awards (23 February 1998)
Song of the Year Award of the 9th Kral TV Video and Music Awards, with the song "Abayı Yaktım" written and composed by Şehrazat (24 March 2003)

Ancestors

References

External links

Sehrazatmusic on Myspace
Şehrazat on Spotify
Şehrazat on TTNET Müzik

1952 births
Avant-garde jazz singers
Living people
People from Ankara
People from Erzurum
Businesspeople from Istanbul
Ragtime composers
Turkish artists
Turkish composers
Turkish women singers
Turkish lyricists
Turkish philanthropists
Turkish pop singers
Turkish record producers
Turkish singer-songwriters
Turkish songwriters
Turkish television personalities
Traditional pop music singers
Musicians from Ankara
Turkish women record producers